Henri Julien Félix Rousseau (21 May 1844 – 2 September 1910) was a French post-impressionist painter in the Naïve or Primitive manner.  He was also known as Le Douanier (the customs officer), a humorous description of his occupation as a toll and tax collector. He started painting seriously in his early forties; by age 49, he retired from his job to work on his art full-time.

Ridiculed during his lifetime by critics, he came to be recognized as a self-taught genius whose works are of high artistic quality. Rousseau's work exerted an extensive influence on several generations of avant-garde artists.

Biography

Early life
Rousseau was born in Laval, Mayenne, France, in 1844 into the family of a tinsmith; he was forced to work there as a small boy. He attended Laval High School as a day student, and then as a boarder after his father became a debtor and his parents had to leave the town upon the seizure of their house. Though mediocre in some of his high school subjects, Rousseau won prizes for drawing and music.

After high school, he worked for a lawyer and studied law, but "attempted a small perjury and sought refuge in the army." He served four years, starting in 1863. With his father's death, Rousseau moved to Paris in 1868 to support his widowed mother as a government employee.

In 1868, he married Clémence Boitard, his landlord's 15-year-old daughter, with whom he had six children (only one survived). In 1871, he was appointed as a collector of the octroi of Paris, collecting taxes on goods entering Paris. His wife died in 1888 and he married Josephine Noury in 1898.

Career

From 1886, he exhibited regularly in the Salon des Indépendants, and, although his work was not placed prominently, it drew an increasing following over the years. Tiger in a Tropical Storm (Surprised!) was exhibited in 1891, and Rousseau received his first serious review when the young artist Félix Vallotton wrote: "His tiger surprising its prey ought not to be missed; it's the alpha and omega of painting."  Yet it was more than a decade before Rousseau returned to depicting his vision of jungles.

In 1893, Rousseau moved to a studio in Montparnasse where he lived and worked until his death in 1910. In 1897, he produced one of his most famous paintings, La Bohémienne endormie (The Sleeping Gypsy).

In 1905, Rousseau's large jungle scene The Hungry Lion Throws Itself on the Antelope was exhibited at the Salon des Indépendants near works by younger leading avant-garde artists such as Henri Matisse, in what is now seen as the first showing of The Fauves. Rousseau's painting may even have influenced the naming of the Fauves.

In 1907, he was commissioned by artist Robert Delaunay's mother, Berthe, Comtesse de Delaunay, to paint The Snake Charmer.

Le Banquet Rousseau
When Pablo Picasso happened upon a painting by Rousseau being sold on the street as a canvas to be painted over, the younger artist instantly recognised Rousseau's genius and went to meet him. In 1908, Picasso held a half serious, half burlesque banquet in his studio at Le Bateau-Lavoir in Rousseau's honour. Le Banquet Rousseau, "one of the most notable social events of the twentieth century," wrote American poet and literary critic John Malcolm Brinnin, "was neither an orgiastic occasion nor even an opulent one. Its subsequent fame grew from the fact that it was a colorful happening within a revolutionary art movement at a point of that movement's earliest success, and from the fact that it was attended by individuals whose separate influences radiated like spokes of creative light across the art world for generations."

Guests at the banquet Rousseau included: Guillaume Apollinaire, Jean Metzinger, Juan Gris, Max Jacob, Marie Laurencin, André Salmon, Maurice Raynal, Daniel-Henri Kahnweiler, Leo Stein, and Gertrude Stein.

Maurice Raynal, in Les Soirées de Paris, 15 January 1914, p. 69, wrote about "Le Banquet Rousseau". Years later the French writer André Salmon recalled the setting of the illustrious banquet:

Retirement and death
After Rousseau's retirement in 1893, he supplemented his small pension with part-time jobs and work such as playing a violin in the streets. He also worked briefly at Le petit Journal, where he produced a number of its covers. Rousseau exhibited his final painting, The Dream, in March 1910, at the Salon des Independants.

In the same month Rousseau suffered a phlegmon in his leg, one which he ignored. In August, when he was admitted to the Necker Hospital in Paris where his son had died, he was found to have gangrene in his leg. After an operation, he died from a blood clot on 2 September 1910.

At his funeral, seven friends stood at his grave: the painters Paul Signac and Manuel Ortiz de Zárate; the artist couple Robert Delaunay and Sonia Terk; the sculptor Constantin Brâncuși; Rousseau's landlord Armand Queval, and Guillaume Apollinaire, who wrote the epitaph Brâncuși put on the tombstone:

We salute you Gentle Rousseau you can hear us.
Delaunay, his wife, Monsieur Queval and myself.
Let our luggage pass duty free through the gates of heaven.
We will bring you brushes paints and canvas.
That you may spend your sacred leisure in the
light and Truth of Painting.
As you once did my portrait facing the stars, lion and the gypsy.

Artistry

Paintings

Rousseau claimed he had "no teacher other than nature", although he admitted he had received "some advice" from two established Academic painters, Félix Auguste Clément and Jean-Léon Gérôme. Essentially, he was self-taught and is considered to be a naïve or primitive painter.

His best-known paintings depict jungle scenes, even though he never left France or saw a jungle. Stories spread by admirers that his army service included the French expeditionary force to Mexico are unfounded. His inspiration came from illustrations in children's books and the botanical gardens in Paris, as well as tableaux of taxidermy wild animals. During his term of service, he had also met soldiers who had survived the French expedition to Mexico, and he listened to their stories of the subtropical country they had encountered. To the critic Arsène Alexandre, he described his frequent visits to the Jardin des Plantes: "When I go into the glass houses and I see the strange plants of exotic lands, it seems to me that I enter into a dream."

Along with his exotic scenes there was a concurrent output of smaller topographical images of the city and its suburbs.

He claimed to have invented a new genre of portrait landscape, which he achieved by starting a painting with a specific view, such as a favourite part of the city, and then depicting a person in the foreground.

Criticism and recognition
Rousseau's flat, seemingly childish style was disparaged by many critics; people often were shocked by his work or ridiculed it. His ingenuousness was extreme, and he always aspired, in vain, to conventional acceptance. Many observers commented that he painted like a child, but the work shows sophistication with his particular technique.

Legacy

Rousseau's work exerted an extensive influence on several generations of avant-garde artists, including Pablo Picasso, Jean Hugo, Fernand Léger Jean Metzinger, Max Beckmann, and the Surrealists. According to Roberta Smith, an art critic writing in The New York Times, "Beckmann’s amazing self-portraits, for example, descend from the brusque, concentrated forms of Rousseau’s portrait of the writer Pierre Loti."

In 1911, a retrospective exhibition of Rousseau's works was shown at the Salon des Indépendants. His paintings were also shown at the first Blaue Reiter exhibition.

Critics have noted the influence of Rousseau on Wallace Stevens's poetry. See, for instance, Stevens's "Floral Decorations for Bananas" in the collection Harmonium.

The American poet Sylvia Plath was a great admirer of Rousseau, referencing his art, as well as drawing inspiration from his works in her poetry. The poem, "Yadwigha, on a Red Couch, Among Lilies" (1958), is based upon his painting, The Dream, whilst the poem "Snakecharmer" (1957) is based upon his painting The Snake Charmer.

The song "The Jungle Line", by Joni Mitchell, is based upon a Rousseau painting.

Underground comic artist Bill Griffith drew a four-page biographical sketch of Rousseau, A Couch in the Sun, which was included in issue #2 of the Arcade anthology.

The visual style of Michel Ocelot's 1998 animation film, Kirikou and the Sorceress, is partly inspired by Rousseau, particularly the depiction of the jungle vegetation.

A Rousseau painting was used as an inspiration for the 2005 animated film Madagascar.

Rousseau's 1908 painting Fight Between a Tiger and a Buffalo was used as the inspiration for a series of 2021 advertisements concerning the rebrand of Facebook into the metaverse company Meta.

Exhibitions

Two major museum exhibitions of his work were held in 1984–85 (in Paris, at the Grand Palais; and in New York, at the Museum of Modern Art) and in 2001 (Tübingen, Germany). "These efforts countered the persona of the humble, oblivious naïf by detailing his assured single-mindedness and tracked the extensive influence his work exerted on several generations of vanguard artists," critic Roberta Smith wrote in a review of a later exhibition.

A major exhibition of his work, "Henri Rousseau: Jungles in Paris", was shown at the Tate Modern from November 2005 for four months, organised by the Tate and the Musée d'Orsay, where the show also appeared. The exhibition, encompassing 49 of his paintings, was on display at the National Gallery of Art in Washington from 16 July to 15 October 2006.

A major collection of Rousseau's work was shown at the Grand Palais from 15 March to 19 June 2006.

Gallery

References

Further reading
 Much of the information in this article was taken from Henri Rousseau Jungles in Paris, The Tate Gallery, pamphlet accompanying the 2005 exhibition.*The Banquet Years, by Roger Shattuck (includes an extensive Rousseau essay)
Henri Rousseau, 1979, Dora Vallier (general illustrated essay)
Henri Rousseau, 1984, The Museum of Modern Art New York (essays by Roger Shattuck, Henri Béhar, Michel Hoog, Carolyn Lanchner, and William Rubin; includes excellent color plates and analysis)

External links

Henrirousseau.org, 118 works by Henri Rousseau
Henri Rousseau: Jungles in Paris, at the National Gallery of Art 
Rousseau text written for young readers Brief introduction to the artist's life and art. Entry contains links to two large reproductions of Rousseau paintings in the National Gallery of Art, a 4th grade lesson relating Rousseau's paintings to ecology, and hands-on activities suitable for classroom or home study.
Ten Dreams Galleries
  The Sleeping Gypsy in the MoMA Online Collection

1844 births
1910 deaths
People from Laval, Mayenne
19th-century French painters
French male painters
20th-century French painters
20th-century French male artists
Post-impressionist painters
Naïve painters
Self-taught artists
Burials at the Cimetière parisien de Bagneux
19th-century French male artists
Deaths from blood clot
Deaths from surgical complications